Caudill is a surname. Notable people with the surname include:

Bill Caudill (born 1956), American baseball player
Harry M. Caudill (1922–1990), American writer, historian and lawyer
Randall Caudill, American businessman
Rebecca Caudill (1899–1985), American writer
Walter C. Caudill (1888–1963), Virginia physician and legislator
William Abel Caudill (1920–1972), American medical anthropologist